Jacob Jeffries Band was an American pop rock band from Ft. Lauderdale, Florida. Formed in 2006, the band consisted of Jacob Jeffries (vocals, piano), Jimmy Powers V (electric guitar, backing vocals) and several alternating members.

Jacob Jeffries Band was named 2008's "Best Live Band & Best New Release' by the Broward-Palm Beach and Miami New Times, and were selected to perform in, and won the Florida Grammy Showcase.

History
Jacob was born in Fort Lauderdale, Florida.  He began playing the piano when he was 5 years old and writing original music at age 10. He wasn't planning on pursuing a music career under any other moniker other than his birth name (a different last name) but the death of his father Jeffrey fell just weeks before the first EP release (Life As An Extra).  JEFFries, is a nod to his father. In 2006 Jacob formed the Jacob Jeffries Band with friends Jimmy Powers on guitar, Brian Lang on bass and Josh "Papa Bear" Connolly on drums.

Between 2006 & 2012 Jacob released 2 EP's (Life As An Extra, Wonderful), a live album (Waiting For The Piano Movers) & a full-length LP (Tell Me Secrets) that he recorded with Grammy Award-winning producers Sebastian Krys & Dan Warner.

Discography
Jacob Jeffries Band released a series of albums engineered and produced by Sebastian Krys and Dan Warner and published by Warner/Chappell Music.

Life As an Extra (2008)
Life As an Extra, the first CD by Jacob Jeffries Band was released in the beginning of 2008.

Wonderful (2008)
Wonderful was Jacob Jeffries Band's second project released later in 2008.

Waiting for the Piano Movers (2009)
In September 2009, the Jacob Jeffries Band was invited to Full Sail University for an all-expense-paid recording of their first live CD, Waiting for the Piano Movers. This live album features 10 songs all recorded at the live performance. One of the band's producers, Sebastian Krys, is a Full Sail graduate and brought the band back to his college.  One of the final tracks is a song written for the lead singer's father who suddenly died a year or so before the recorded concert. Although, Jacob Jeffries Band released this live album shortly after Wonderful, it features many songs never heard before on either previous EP.

Tell Me Secrets (2012)
The band's fourth full-length studio album was released in 2012 under Boom Boom 88 Music.  The album features cameo  session musician Matt Chamberlain on drums. Tell Me Secrets was released on the freshly established Boom Boom 88 Music label that Jacob and his business partners created in the fall of 2011.

References

External links 
 

Alternative rock groups from Florida
American pop rock music groups
Musical groups from Fort Lauderdale, Florida
2006 establishments in Florida
Musical groups established in 2006